Estadio Municipal Centenario Manuel Rivera Sánchez is a multi-purpose stadium in Chimbote, Peru. It was inaugurated on June 30, 2007 with a friendly game between the Peru U-17 national football team and the Colombia U-17 national football team. Peru lost 4–2. It hosts the home games of José Gálvez FBC. The stadium has a capacity of 25,000 people. It replaced Estadio Manuel Gómez Arellano.

External links
World Stadiums

Football venues in Peru
Multi-purpose stadiums in Peru
Buildings and structures in Ancash Region